The 2020–21 Tennessee Tech Golden Eagles men's basketball team represented Tennessee Technological University in the 2020–21 NCAA Division I men's basketball season. The Golden Eagles, led by second-year head coach John Pelphrey, played their home games at the Eblen Center in Cookeville, Tennessee as members of the Ohio Valley Conference.

Previous season
The Golden Eagles finished the 2019–20 season 9–22, 6–12 in OVC play to finish in ninth place. They failed to qualify for the OVC tournament.

Roster

Schedule and results 

|-
!colspan=12 style=| Regular season

|-

Sources

References

Tennessee Tech Golden Eagles men's basketball seasons
Tennessee Tech Golden Eagles
Tennessee Tech Golden Eagles men's basketball
Tennessee Tech Golden Eagles men's basketball